Beecher's Trilobite Bed is a Konservat-Lagerstätte of Late Ordovician (Caradoc) age located within the Frankfort Shale in Cleveland's Glen, Oneida County, New York, USA. Only 3-4 centimeters thick, Beecher's Trilobite Bed has yielded numerous exceptionally preserved trilobites with the ventral anatomy and soft tissue intact, the soft tissue preserved by pyrite replacement. Pyritisation allows the use of X-rays to study fine detail of preserved soft body parts still within the host rock. Pyrite replacement of soft tissue is unusual in the fossil
record; the only Lagerstätten thought to show such
preservation were Beecher's Trilobite Bed, the Devonian Hunsrück Slates of Germany, and the Jurassic beds of La Voulte-sur-Rhône in France, although new locations are coming to light in New York state.

History of research 

Originally discovered in 1892 by William S. Valiant, the site was thoroughly excavated from 1893 to 1895 by Charles Emerson Beecher (after whom the location is named) of Yale University, after which time the location was thought to be exhausted of fossils and excavations ceased.
Beecher published three papers describing a trilobite larval form,
trilobite limbs
and trilobite ventral anatomy from material collected from the site he established. Beecher died unexpectedly in 1904; much material, as well as details of the location, was lost. Research was subsequently limited to study of material collected during the original excavations that had been distributed to various institutions.

Amateur fossil collectors Tom E. Whiteley (also responsible for rediscovering the Walcott-Rust quarry) and Dan Cooper rediscovered the location in 1984 and from 1985 academic excavations and studies (re)-commenced. At least 4 other fossil bearing horizons exhibiting similar preservation have subsequently been found at the original site. The small quarry at the site is currently closed to public access, being on private land and administered by Yale Peabody Museum as part of ongoing research projects.

Sedimentology, environment of deposition and preservation 

The original Beecher's Trilobite Bed is found within a thick succession of fine grained turbidite beds, the fossiliferous bed  is about 40 mm thick lying on a scoured mudstone surface with remnants of burrows. Well preserved fossil remains are found 7–10 mm above the base parallel to the bedding plane, strongly aligned by the current, with as many facing up as down. Chemically, the bed contains high iron coupled with low organic carbon and low organic sulfur.

Fauna 
The trilobite Triarthrus eatoni comprises 85% of the organisms sampled at the locality, other taxa include graptolites, branching algae, brachiopods and problematica (incertae sedis). The trilobites Cryptolithus bellulus (Ulrich), Cornuproetus beecheri (Ruedeman), Primaspis crosotus (Locke) are also recorded.

See also
 Beecher's Trilobite type preservation, the preservational pathway responsible

References

External links
 Peabody Museum of Natural History, Yale University (official website)
 Yale Environmental News article with site pictures, see page 9

Paleozoic paleontological sites of North America
Ordovician paleontological sites
Trilobites of North America
Lagerstätten
Geologic formations of New York (state)
Paleontology in New York (state)